Terina may refer to:

 Terina (ancient city), ancient Greek city in Calabria
 Terina (moth), genus of moths
 Terina (brand), brand name used by the Norwegian meat processing company Nortura
 Daphnella terina, species of sea snail
 Terina Te Tamaki (born 1997), New Zealand female rugby union player